John Forsyth Jr. (October 31, 1812 – May 2, 1877) was an American newspaper editor of the Mobile Register and the son of politician John Forsyth.

Biography
Born in Augusta, Georgia, he attended the University of Georgia at Athens where he was a member of the Phi Kappa Literary Society. Forsyth graduated from Princeton in 1832. In 1834, Forsyth married Margaret Hull, the daughter of Latham Hull of Augusta, GA. Their son Charles, born in Mobile, Alabama, would go on to serve as a colonel in the Confederate Army.

Forsyth was for many years one of the foremost Democratic Party editors of the south. He was Adjutant of the First Georgia Regiment in the Mexican War. In 1856 he was appointed Minister to Mexico, but in 1858 demanded his passports and withdrew from the legation. He went on to become the Mayor of Mobile, Alabama in 1860.  By 1863, he served as Chief of Staff in the Confederate Army of Tennessee.

In 1861, with Martin J. Crawford of Georgia, he represented the Confederate States as commissioner to the National government, but his request for an unofficial interview with William Henry Seward was declined. He left for Mobile, Alabama after the Civil War and engaged in journalistic work until health problems compelled him to retire. He died in Mobile on May 2, 1877. The Mobile Register of May 5, 1877 (its columns draped in black) printed a lengthy obituary: "a large congregation of Mobile citizens were assembled to testify by their presence, their love and respect for the honored dead." A funeral cortege traveled to Magnolia Cemetery where the final interment took place.

References

Burnett, Lonnie. The pen makes a good sword : John Forsyth of the Mobile register (University of Alabama Press, 2006)
Shadburn, Don L. Pioneer History of Forsyth County Georgia: 1832-1860, Vol. I. (Pioneer-Cherokee Heritage Series, 1981)

1812 births
19th-century American newspaper editors
1877 deaths
People of Georgia (U.S. state) in the American Civil War
Ambassadors of the United States to Mexico
19th-century American diplomats
American male journalists
19th-century American male writers